Tirrenia is a privately owned Italian shipping company contracted by the Ministry of Transportation to ship items between Italy's mainland and its major islands. It operates a fleet of 23 vessels.

History
Tirrenia Società Anonima di Navigazione was founded in 1936, resulting from the nationalization of many private-owned Italian lines. The company gathered a fleet of 55 ships. When World War II broke out, the number of lines were reduced. By 1942, 50 ships were sunk following the armed conflicts in the Mediterranean sea.

After World War II, the few ships surviving the conflict were used to connect Italian islands, mainly Sardinia, to the mainland. The company became public and its name was changed to Tirrenia di Navigazione S.p.A. In 1965, the company launched the production of fully-fledged ferries, the Poet Class. In the 1970s, ships were gradually replaced by ferries and the company developed its freight activities. In 1975, Tirrenia bought the Malta Express ferry. Since the end of the 1980s, the company has been upgrading its older units with faster ones capable of reaching 35–40 knots.

However, most of these were unpractical or too expensive to operate and are now scrapped. The Italian Government, after having subsidiarized the company some years, privatised Tirrenia in 2012.

On 23 December 2009, Tirrenia was put on the market. Sixteen companies join the bidding, including SNAV, Grandi Navi Veloci, Grimaldi Lines, Moby Lines, Ustica Lines, Corsica Ferries and Mediterranea Holding (including Regione Siciliana and Alexis Tomasos). The latter ends up alone when al the other bidders quit. On 28 July 2010, Mediterranea Holding won the bidding for Tirrenia and Siremar. On 4 August, Fintecna announces that the sale will not happen, since Mediterranea Holding did not show up for signing. On 12 August, the company officially entered receivership, as requested by commissioner Giancarlo D'Andrea.

An agreement has been made for Tirrenia to be taken over by Compagnia Italiana di Navigazione (Cin) in 2012. However, in May the competition authority opened an investigation into whether a dominant position in routes to Sardinia would be created.

In 2014, the company moved from its historic headquarters of Rione Sirignano to Calata Porta di Massa, Interno Porto. In 2015, Tirrenia was entirely acquired by Vincenzo Onorato and became part of the Onorato Armatori group. Pietro Manunta was named president and Massimo Mura Managing Director. Vincenzo Onorato also owns the other ferry company of Naples, Moby. In 2019, Tirrenia raised its prices, leading to reactions from the weakened local competition.

Tirrenia group
Tirrenia Group included until 2010 the following company:
Siremar (Sicilia Regionale Marittima). Connects Sicily with the Aeolian Islands, Aegadian Islands, Ustica, Lampedusa and Pantelleria.

Fleet

Historical fleet

Type Regione (Passenger ship)
Campania Felix (1953–1972)
Sardegna (1953– ?)
Sicilia (1952–1988)
Calabria (1952–1988)
 (1953–1979)
Type Città (Passenger ship)
Citta Di Napoli (1961–1987)
Città di Nuoro (1962–1988)
Type Regional (Ro-Pax)
La Maddalena (1966–1988)
Arbatax (1966–1988)
Carloforte (1976–1986)
Limbara (1978–1988)
Isola Di Caprera (1986–1988)
Ichnusa (1986–1988)
Type Poeta (Ro-Pax)
Boccaccio (1970–1999)
Carducci (1970–1999)
Leopardi (1971–1994)
Manzoni (1971–1999)
Petrarca (1971–1999)
Pascoli (1971–1999)
Deledda (1978–1994)
Verga (1978–1997)
Type Valletta (Ro-Pax)
La Valletta (1971–1976)
Type Staffetta (Ro-Ro)
Staffetta Jonica (1973–1978)
Staffetta Adriatica (1973–1992)
Staffetta Tirrenica (1973–1993)
Type Espresso (Ro-Pax)
Malta Express (1976–1988)
Type Tutto Merci (Ro-Ro)
Staffetta Ligure (1979–1988)
Staffetta Mediterranea (1979–1988)
Type Strada (Ro-Pax)
Emilia (1979–2006)
Domiziana (1979–2011)
Flaminia (1980–2012)
Type Strada Trasformata (Ro-Pax)
Aurelia (1980–2012)
Nomentana (1979–2012)
Clodia (1979–2012)
Type Sociale (Ro-Pax)
Arborea (1987–2004)
Caralis (1988–2000)
Torres (1988–2004)
Type Capo (Ro-Pax)
Capo Spartivento (1987–2001)
Capo Sandalo (1988–2000)
Capo Carbonara (1988–2004)
Type Campania (Ro-Ro)
Campania (1988–2001)
Type Tutto merci (Ro-Ro)
Sardegna (1988–2006)
Calabria (1989–2006)
Sicilia (1990–2006)
Type Viamare (Ro-Ro)
Via Tirreno (1996–2001)
Lazio (2000–2012)
Type Toscana (Ro-Pax)
Toscana (1994–2012)
Type Aquastrada (HSC)
Guizzo (1993–2001)
Scatto (1994–2002)
Type Jupiter (Ro-Pax HSC)
Aries (1997–2011)
Taurus (1997–2011)
Scorpio (1998–2011)
Capricorn (1998–2011)

Routes

Sardinia
Genoa↔Porto Torres
Livorno↔Cagliari (Cargo only)
Civitavecchia↔Olbia
Naples↔Cagliari (Cargo only)

Sicily
Naples↔Palermo

Tunisia
Genoa↔Tunis (in Code Sharing with Compagnie Tunisienne de Navigation)

See also

Vincenzo Onorato

References

External links

 Official Website

Italian brands
Transport companies established in 1936
Italian companies established in 1936
Tirrenia Compagnia Italiana di Navigazione
Ferry companies of Italy
Companies based in Naples